

This is a list of the National Register of Historic Places listings in San Bernardino County, California.

This is intended to be a complete list of the properties and districts on the National Register of Historic Places in San Bernardino County, California, United States. Latitude and longitude coordinates are provided for many National Register properties and districts; these locations may be seen together in an online map.

There are 101 properties and districts listed on the National Register in the county, including 1 National Historic Landmark.

Current listings

|}

See also

List of National Historic Landmarks in California
National Register of Historic Places listings in California
California Historical Landmarks in San Bernardino County, California

References

San Bernardino